The 1993–94 Primera División season was the second category of the Spanish basketball league system during the 1993–94 season. It was the fourth played with the name of Primera División.

Format
32 teams played this season and were divided into two groups of 16 teams called Group A and Group B. For the following season the Primera Division disappears and the Liga EBA is created.
Regular Season
Group A, teams that the previous season earned their place in the category. They play all against all to two turns.
Group B, teams that the previous season had relegated, were re-caught or invited. They play all against all to two turns. The four last qualified teams would be relegated to Segunda División.

Promotion PlayOffs
The four first qualified teams of the Group A would qualify directly to quarterfinals while teams 5th to 10th of Group A and the two first of the Group B would qualify to the round of 16. The two winners of the playoffs promoted to the 1994–95 ACB season.

Teams

Promotion and relegation (pre-season) 
A total of 32 teams contested the league, including 24 sides from the 1992–93 season, four promoted from the Segunda División and four Wild Cards.

Teams promoted from Segunda División
Sant Josep Badalona
Graningas Mollet
CB Calpe
Estudiantes Lugo

Wild Cards
Tenerife Canarias, who obtained a relegation place the previous season.
Vino de Toro, who obtained a relegation place the previous season.
Tecnur CABA
Ambroz Plasencia

Teams that resigned to participate
CB Granada, merged with CAB Loja.
Loyola Easo
CB Mataró
Collado Villalba
CB Askatuak sold his place to CB Salamanca
Conservas Daroca sold his place to Espada Tizona

Venues and locations

Regular season

Group A

Group B

Promotion Playoffs
The two winners of the semifinals are promoted to Liga ACB.

Final standings

References

External links
League at JM Almenzar website
hispaligas.net

Primera División B de Baloncesto
1993–94 in Spanish basketball
Second level Spanish basketball league seasons